Aindrias Ó Caoimh (4 October 1912 – 30 December 1994) was an Irish judge and barrister who served as a Judge of the European Court of Justice from 1975 to 1985, President of the High Court and a Judge of the High Court from 1966 to 1975 and Attorney General of Ireland from January 1950 to June 1950 and 1957 to 1965.

Personal life
Ó Caoimh was educated at O'Connell School and at University College Dublin.

He was a brother of Brian Ó Cuív and uncle of Éamon Ó Cuív. He and his wife Sheila had seven children, one of whom, also Aindrias Ó Caoimh, was, like his father, appointed a member of the European Court of Justice, in 2004. Ó Caoimh died at his home in Ranelagh in Dublin, and is buried in Glasnevin Cemetery.
Ó Caoimh's son, of the same name, is Irish judge who served as a Judge of the European Court of Justice from 2004 to 2015, and as Judge of the High Court from 1999 to 2004.

Lawless v. Ireland
During his second term as Attorney General of Ireland he represented the Government of Ireland in Lawless v. Ireland (1957–1961), the first case before the European Court of Human Rights, taken by Gerald Lawless, who was represented by Seán MacBride, the human rights lawyer. The case concerned the detention without trial of a suspected member of the IRA who claimed that Ireland had breached Articles 5, 6 and 7 of the European Convention of Human Rights that provide rights to liberty and security, fair trial and the principle of ‘no punishment without law’. The court found in favour of the Irish Government that no violation of the European Convention on Human Rights had taken place.

Arms Trial
In September 1970, Ó Caoimh withdrew from the Arms Trial, with the result that the case had to be re-heard after six days of evidence had already been given.

See also
List of members of the European Court of Justice

References

External links
Attorney General page

1912 births
1994 deaths
Attorneys General of Ireland
Presidents of the High Court (Ireland)
European Court of Justice judges
20th-century Irish lawyers
20th-century Irish judges
Irish judges of international courts and tribunals
Alumni of King's Inns